Oncopeltus sexmaculatus, the six-spotted milkweed bug, is a species of seed bug in the family Lygaeidae. It is found on islands in the Caribbean Sea, Central America, and North America.

References

Further reading

External links

 

Lygaeidae
Articles created by Qbugbot
Insects described in 1874